Gerich is a surname. Notable people with the surname include:

 Sven Gerich (born 1974), German politician, since 1 July 2013 Gerich is mayor of Wiesbaden
 John Gerich (born 1947), Canadian politician in Saskatchewan, MLA for Redberry, and former member of the Royal Canadian Mounted Police
 Walter von Gerich, Finnish civil servant and later an agent in German pay during World War I